The Waterloo Tunnel in Liverpool, England, is a former railway tunnel,  long, which opened in 1849. Its western end was at 53.414829, -2.994385, underneath Pall Mall. From here the line continued under Great Howard Street to Waterloo Goods railway station, now the site of the Kingsway Tunnel Ventilation Shaft, after 1895 continuing beyond to the dock railway system and on to Liverpool Riverside at the Pier Head for direct connection to the passenger liners. The eastern end opens into a short cutting, four tracks wide between Byrom Street and Fontenoy Street, which connects to the Victoria Tunnel, which emerges at Edge Hill station. It is effectively one long tunnel from Edge Hill to Liverpool Waterloo Dock with two names along its route. The tunnels were given two different names because initially trains in the Victoria Tunnel were cable hauled and in the Waterloo Tunnel locomotive hauled. Both tunnels closed on 19 November 1972.

In May 2007 it was reported that chief executive of Merseytravel, Neil Scales, had prepared a report outlining the possibilities for reuse of the Victoria/Waterloo and Wapping tunnels. Merseytravel safeguard the tunnel for future use.

In 2016, work began on replacing the road bridge on Great Howard Street that crosses over the dock entrance to the tunnel. Whilst it would have been cheaper to remove the existing bridge and in fill the resulting gap, the Department for Transport insisted the bridge was replaced at a cost of £9.7 million in order to preserve the tunnel for future use.

See also
 Victoria Tunnel (Liverpool)

References

Further reading
 Moore, Jim (1998) Underground Liverpool, Liverpool : Bluecoat Press,

External links
 Euston to New York via Liverpool 3,248 Miles — Steam powered all the way
 Subterranea Britannica
 Victoria Tunnel

Rail transport in Liverpool
Railway tunnels in England
Buildings and structures in Liverpool
Tunnels completed in 1849
Tunnels in Liverpool
1849 establishments in England